Köşkü (also, Keşkü, Keshkyu, Keshki, and Keshkyul’) is a village in the Goygol Rayon of Azerbaijan.  The village forms part of the municipality of Aşıqlı.

References 

Populated places in Goygol District